Jeffrey Scott Knapple (born August 27, 1956 in Würzburg, Germany) is a former American football quarterback in the National Football League who played for the Denver Broncos. He played college football for the UCLA Bruins, Colorado Buffaloes, and Northern Colorado Bears. He also played in the Canadian Football League for the Calgary Stampeders and in the USFL for the Denver Gold and New Jersey Generals.

Knapple married actress Jill Whelan in 2017.

References

1956 births
Living people
American football quarterbacks
Canadian football quarterbacks
Denver Broncos players
Calgary Stampeders players
Denver Gold players
New Jersey Generals players
UCLA Bruins football players
Colorado Buffaloes football players
Northern Colorado Bears football players